Rizal S Barellano Jr (born 15 June 1965 in Tupi, South Cotabato) is a former Filipino professional darts player who played in Professional Darts Corporation tournaments.

Darts career
Barellano reached the quarter finals of the 2006 WDF Asis-Pacific Cup, winning group C2 and eventually lost to Malaysian Amin Abdul Ghani who won the tournament. Barellano won the national qualifier to earn himself a place in the 2008 PDC World Darts Championship where he lost in the preliminary round 5-0 to Miloslav Navrátil.

Barellano Quit the PDC in 2009.

World Championship Results

PDC
 2008: Last 68: (lost to Miloslav Navratil 0–5) (legs)

External links
Profile and stats on Darts Database

Filipino darts players
Living people
1965 births
British Darts Organisation players
Professional Darts Corporation associate players